Julie Forss (born 5 January 1998) is a Finnish footballer.
She played for  Tampereen Ilves from 2015 to 2020. She moved to PK-35 in 2021. She played as a defender on the Finland women's national under-17 football team in 2015 and the Finland women's national under-20 football team in 2017.

References

1998 births
Living people
Finnish women's footballers
PK-35 (women) players
Kansallinen Liiga players
Women's association football defenders